All Saints Church is in the village of Burton in Lonsdale, North Yorkshire, England. It is an active Anglican parish church in the deanery of Ewecross, the archdeaconry of Craven, and the Diocese of Leeds. Its benefice has been united with that of St Oswald, Thornton in Lonsdale. The church is recorded in the National Heritage List for England as a designated Grade II* listed building. It stands in High Street, opposite the site of Burton in Lonsdale Castle.

History
The church was built between 1868 and 1876, and designed by the Lancaster partnership of Paley and Austin. People note that it was seems a large church for what is a small town, but this is because it was thought the railway would come to the village and its population would expand. The first vicar of the church was Revd Frederick Binyon, father of the poet Lawrence Binyon.

Architecture
All Saints is constructed in sandstone, with a slate roof. The porch is in wood, with a tiled roof. Its architectural style is Early English. The plan consists of a four-bay nave, a north aisle, a north porch, a chancel, a north vestry, and a tower occupying the position of a south transept. The tower is in three stages with buttresses. On its west side are single-light lancet windows in the bottom and middle stages. The top stage contains lancet bell openings. Around the top of the tower are corbel tables, and the tower is surmounted by a broach spire. There are two- and three-light windows in the nave, and a four-light window in the vestry. The chancel has two-light lancet windows on the north and south sides. The east window has three stepped lights, with smaller windows above. Inside the church, the arcade between the nave and aisle has a glass screen which was inserted in about 1970. In the chancel are a piscina and a double sedilia. There is a ring of six bells, all cast in 1870 by John Warner and Sons. The churchyard wall and gates are included in the listing.

See also
List of ecclesiastical works by Paley and Austin

References

Churches completed in 1876
19th-century Church of England church buildings
Gothic Revival church buildings in England
Gothic Revival architecture in North Yorkshire
Church of England church buildings in North Yorkshire
Grade II* listed churches in North Yorkshire
Anglican Diocese of Leeds
Paley and Austin buildings